Lovro Gnjidić (born April 18, 2001) is a Croatian professional basketball player currently playing for Cedevita Olimpija of the Slovenian League. Standing at  1.98 m, he plays at the point guard position.

Professional career 
Gnjidić grew up in the youth system of Cibona, where he also started his professional career. In the 2020–21 season, after the first choice point guard Scottie Reynolds was sidelined due to injury, Gnjidić unexpectedly got much more time on court. His good plays attracted the attention of the Montenegrin Mornar Bar, which tried to sign him during the Summer of 2021. After a lot of rumour and press reports of his transfer, he eventually decided to stay in Cibona.

In April 2022, Gnjidić declared for the 2022 NBA draft. Later, he withdrawn his name from consideration for the 2022 NBA draft.

In July 2022, after winning the Croatian League and Croatian Cup with Cibona, he signed a two-year contract with the Slovenian Cedevita Olimpija.

National team career 

Gnjidić played for the Croatian national basketball team youth selections. He was part of the teams that competed at the 2018 FIBA Under-17 Basketball World Cup, 2018 FIBA U18 European Championship, 2019 FIBA U18 European Championship and 2021 FIBA U20 European Challengers.

Gnjidić debuted for the Croatian A team in November 2021 at the 2023 FIBA Basketball World Cup qualification game against Slovenia. Croatia was eliminated after the first round of qualification. In the last decisive match against Finland in  July 2022, Croatia failed to hold a 5-point lead a minute before the end of the match with Gnjidić missing all four of his penalty shots in the last minute.

Personal life 
Gnjidić was brought up in a basketball family. His mother Lidija and father Boris were both professional basketball players.

References

External links 
 Profile at aba-liga.com
 Profile at basketball-reference.com
 Profile at proballers.com
 Profile at realgm.com

2001 births
Living people
Point guards
Croatian men's basketball players
ABA League players
KK Cibona players
Basketball players from Zagreb